William D. Clarke, Sr.  (born 1941) is an American diplomat. Clarke served as the United States Ambassador to Eritrea from 1998 to 2001. He previously served over 30 years as a diplomat and member of the Diplomatic Security Service, including becoming the Deputy Assistant Secretary for Countermeasures and Information Security before his ambassadorship.  

On October 3, 2022, the State Department announced a fellowship enabling a pipeline to become Diplomatic Security Service Special Agent named in Clarke's honor.

References

Ambassadors of the United States to Eritrea
1941 births
Living people
Howard University alumni
United States Foreign Service personnel
20th-century American diplomats
21st-century American diplomats